Shadore is a village in the Khyber Pakhtunkhwa province of Pakistan. It is located in Union Council Shamdarra, in Oghi Tehsil of Mansehra District.

Languages 
The main language of this village is Hindko.

Pictures 

Union councils of Mansehra District
Villages in Pakistan